Silvan Lopes Lichtenecker  (born 20 July 1973) was a Brazilian football player.

Club career 
He mainly played for clubs in Brazil.

He also played for Pohang Steelers of the South Korean K League, then known as the POSCO Atoms.

References

External links 
 
 Profile

1973 births
Living people
Association football midfielders
Brazilian footballers
Brazilian expatriate footballers
Pohang Steelers players
K League 1 players
Brazilian expatriate sportspeople in South Korea
Expatriate footballers in South Korea